William Hunt and Sons or WHS is a British brand of masonry tools and other types of edge tools. The WHS 4" pointing trowel is well known as a standard excavation implement in British archaeology.

History
The founder of the company, William Hunt, was an edge tool maker at Rowley Regis, near Dudley, Worcestershire, in the late 18th century. In 1782 he purchased the Brades Estate at Oldbury, near Birmingham, and established a new works there known as Brades Forge, or simply as The Brades. By 1805 they were also manufacturing steel on the site, which was now known as the Brades Steel Works. Around 1793, Hunt took W. Cliffe into partnership, and for a short period the firm was known as Hunt and Cliffe: this name appears in the company's first ledger, dated 9 May 1794. This partnership dissolved around 1803, and Hunt continued trading on his own account until 1809, when he took his sons into partnership and the firm became known as William Hunt & Sons.

In 1828 the company acquired William Edwards and Sons (incorporating the Eagle Edge Tool Company), and later the business of Bache Bros, spade makers of Churchill Forge, near Stourbridge. In the late 19th century George Heaton became a major shareholder in the company.

In 1951 the company amalgamated with Nash Tyzack to form Brades Nash Tyzack Industries, and later took over the business of Skelton. In 1962, together with Harrison, they became part of Spear & Jackson, who in 1967 also acquired Edward Elwell Ltd, all the companies coming together as parts of S&J by 1972. In 1985 S&J became part of the Neill Tools Group based in  Sheffield, who still own the brand today.

Brands
The company's major UK trade marks were BRADES and WHS, but they had many others, some of which, such as Eagle, Giraffe and Pagoda, were only used on tools made for export.

Archaeological trowels 

The WHS pointing trowel is prized amongst archaeologists in the United Kingdom who find its strength useful in digging heavy deposits. In his 1946 book Field Archaeology, Richard J. C. Atkinson (best known for excavating Stonehenge), "unequivocally" recommended the use of a trowel for archaeology; during the postwar era, WHS and a competing brand from Bowden were predominant. By 1960, archaeologist Paul Stamper was told that a WHS trowel was a "prerequisite", and by 1999, he deemed it the "industry standard". Current Archaeology summed up the choices:

In 2005, the company introduced a new version of its 4" WHS pointing trowel. The thinner and more brittle design was designed for the construction industry, and encountered resistance from archaeologists who found it inferior to its predecessor model. Oxford Archaeology indicated it might switch to the American-made Marshalltown trowel; and British Archaeological Jobs Resource received complaints of breakages on site. In response, in the summer of 2006, the firm launched a new trowel, marked "Archaeologists' Trowel" on the blade, the design of which took account of archaeologists' concerns and the results of field trials. It incorporated a thicker, stronger blade, higher lift for extra knuckle clearance, and a flattened tang to prevent handle rotation.

References

External links
WHS trowels in archaeology
S&J Family Tree
The Digger
The BAJR Forum
A History of Oldbury
Brades Export Catalogue 1941
Nation Archives George Heaton
A Description of Modern Birmingham, c.1818 by Charles Pye
A Topographical Dictionary of England 1848 ed Samuel Lewis - see under Rowley Regis
Hunt & Cliffe

Defunct manufacturing companies of the United Kingdom
Methods in archaeology
Defunct companies based in Sheffield
British companies established in 1793
Companies based in the West Midlands (county)
Oldbury, West Midlands